Surtur is a fictional character appearing in American comic books published by Marvel Comics, commonly as an enemy of Thor. Based on the fire giant Surtr from Norse mythology, he was adapted by writer Stan Lee and artist Jack Kirby, and first appeared in Journey into Mystery #97 (October 1963). The character was once described as one of "The Ten Most Heinous Enemies of the Mighty Thor".

The character has appeared in several media adaptations of Thor. Surtur made his live-action debut in the Marvel Cinematic Universe film Thor: Ragnarok (2017), motion-captured by Taika Waititi, and voiced by Clancy Brown. Brown reprised the role as an alternate reality version of the character in the Disney+ animated series What If...? (2021).

Publication history

Based on the fire giant Surtr from Norse mythology and created by Stan Lee and Jack Kirby, the character first appears in Journey into Mystery #97 (Oct 1963).

Fictional character biography
Surtur is a fire giant native to the extradimensional plane of Muspelheim, land of the fire demons and one of the nine worlds in Norse mythology. He first appears in the title Journey into Mystery, where it is claimed he sits at the end of the world waiting for the end of time where he can slay men and gods. The character's first encounter with the Asgardian ruler Odin is told in flashback and  establishes their enmity when Surtur is imprisoned by Odin inside the Earth after forming an alliance with the Trolls and trying to destroy the world in anger for Odin defying him, although he gives Odin a winged horse, hoping to be released one day. Surtur reappears in Journey into Mystery #104, having been freed by Odin's adopted son, Loki, who intends to usurp Odin and rule Asgard, having been given a portion of the Odinforce. Together with the Storm Giant Skagg, the character invades Earth, although the pair are met by Odin, his son the Thunder God Thor and fellow Asgardian Balder. Odin stops time and sends every human on Earth to another dimension. Surtur creates a blazing fireball and travels to the North Pole to melt the icecaps. Using Odin's sword, Thor stops Surtur and traps him on a meteorite of magnetic particles in another galaxy.

In the title Thor the seer Volla predicts that Loki will free Surtur and other enemies of Asgard and eventually bring about Ragnarok – a war that will end with the destruction of all the Norse Gods. The character features in the title The Avengers when summoned – together with ice giant Ymir – to Earth by the cult the Sons of Satannish. The entities are banished by the combined efforts of the superhero team the Avengers, the hero the Black Knight, and the sorcerer Doctor Strange. They are tricked into striking each other, which defeats them both.

Surtur becomes a recurring foe in the title Thor, and first attempts to invade Asgard during the Odinsleep when Loki has briefly taken control, causing Loki to flee Asgard, but he is repelled and imprisoned. Surtur reappears wielding the huge magical blade Twilight, and after sending a horde of demons to invade Earth storms Asgard. The heroes of Earth battle the fire demons while in Asgard Surtur defeats both Thor and Odin in turn. Loki deceives Surtur with an illusion until Odin recovers, who battles the fire demon until both fall into a dimensional rift. After a long absence Odin returns to Asgard, and it is revealed that he absorbed Surtur's essence, which eventually possesses him. Surtur manages to recreate his physical form and decimates Asgard until Thor, wielding the Odin Power, banishes Surtur to the Sea of Eternal Night.

Surtur appears at the conclusion of the second volume of Thor during the final Ragnarok of Asgard, and is allowed to storm Asgard by Thor as the Thunder God attempts to break the endless cycle of death and rebirth for the Norse Gods. In the limited series Stormbreaker: The Saga of Beta Ray Bill, the alien Beta Ray Bill visits the ruins of Asgard after the battle, and sees Surtur's dead form falling from the sky, still clutching Twilight.

Thor returns from a period of self-induced hibernation in a third self-titled volume, and enters the Odinsleep to find Odin in a limbo dimension between life and death, where Surtur stored a portion of his essence to prevent himself from being killed forever. Here Odin and the demon battle to the death, being reborn each day to repeat the cycle, preventing either from being reborn. Thor helps Odin beat Surtur twice, even though he will be reborn, before returning to his body. Thor offers to help Odin escape from this realm and the constant battle with Surtur. Odin chooses to remain in order to protect his people from the demon.

Surtur was resurrected and made a deal with Loki and a group of beings known as the Manchester Gods, who he manipulated to depose the native gods of the British isles. He then set the world tree Yggdrasil on fire and attempted to turn the Vanir gods against the Aesir in preparation for his assault on Asgard. This succeeded because of old grudges, namely Odin's insistence that the people of Vanaheim fall under his rule no matter what.

Powers, abilities, and equipment
Surtur was depicted as an immense, but malevolent elemental fire demon of apocalyptic proportions. Standing over 1,000 feet (300 m) in height, Surtur possesses physical attributes far surpassing than Thor himself, the ability to generate intense heat, flames, or concussive force, a prehensile tail, capable of transforming his fingers into serpents via molecular rearrangement, flight, and interdimensional travel. His cosmic powers are usually shown to equal that of Odin. He is a master warrior and swordsman. Surtur has great wisdom, as well as extensive knowledge of ancient lore. He is also vulnerable to extreme coldness or certain magic spells.

Equipment
The Twilight Sword (also called the Sword of Doom) is composed from a unique metal alloy known as Scabrite, which can only be found in the mines of Surtur's realm. This giant weapon possesses mystical properties that allows Surtur to manipulate magical energy in vast amounts and perform nearly limitless feats, such as shattering dimensional barriers or inhibiting Odin's powers. When this sword bonded with the Eternal Flame, its capabilities are further increased to an unknown level.

The Eternal Flame (also known as the Eternal Flame of Destruction) has a mystical connection to Surtur and cannot be extinguished, no matter what. When in its vicinity, Surtur claimed it had doubled his abilities.

Reception
 In 2022, CBR.com ranked Surtur 5th in their "Black Knight's 10 Strongest Villains" list.

Other versions
Surtur appears in an Amalgam Comics one-shot publication Thorion of the New Gods, in which he assaults Asgard during Ragnarök, but is stopped and imprisoned by the DC Comics Source on the Ego-Mass—an amalgamation of Ego and the Source Wall.

In the Ultimate Marvel reality, Surtur is seen summoned to Earth by Loki and battling the Ultimates. However, he is not seen in the final battle with the Ultimates.

In the series JLA/Avengers, Surtur is part of Krona's army, and attacks Wonder Woman near the end of the issue after she vows to guard a pass so the other heroes can get through, although She-Hulk stays to help her.

In other media

Television
 Surtur appears in the Spider-Man and His Amazing Friends episode "The Vengeance of Loki". Iceman gets teleported to Surtur's domain and experiences difficulty fighting the fire giant off until Zerona the Ice Giant comes to his rescue.
 Surtur appears in The Avengers: Earth's Mightiest Heroes, voiced by Rick D. Wasserman. In the episode "Acts of Vengeance", Baron Heinrich Zemo uses the Norn Stone associated with Muspelheim to protect himself against the Enchantress, which freed Surtur from his imprisonment. The fire demon attacks the Dwarves' realm as Eitri held fragments of his Twilight Sword and enslaves the Enchantress after she appears before him. In "The Ballad of Beta Ray Bill", Surtur sends a possessed Enchantress to unleash Fire Demons upon different planets, with one of them being Beta Ray Bill's home planet. After he and Thor defeat the Enchantress, Surtur teleports her away before reforging his Twilight Sword.
 Surtur appears in Avengers Assemble. In the episode "Nighthawk", the titular character uses a Norn Stone to send Thor through Surtur's realm 81 times before the Hulk frees him. In "Back to the Learning Hall", Thor, Hulk, and Hawkeye are transported to Surtur's realm, but Heimdall rescues them.

Film
 Surtur's sword "Elderstahl" serves as a focal point of Thor: Tales of Asgard, while Surtur himself appears in flashbacks battling Odin over the fate of the Nine Realms.
 Surtur makes a non-speaking cameo appearance in Hulk Vs Thor.

Marvel Cinematic Universe 

 Surtur appears in the live-action Marvel Cinematic Universe film Thor: Ragnarok, motion-captured by Taika Waititi and voiced by Clancy Brown. He imprisons Thor in his lair in Muspelheim and reveals that Odin is not on Asgard, where Surtur plans to unite his crown with the Eternal Flame so that he can cause Ragnarök and destroy Asgard. While Thor defeats Surtur and escapes with his crown, Thor later realizes that causing Ragnarök is the only way he can defeat Hela, so he tasks Loki with resurrecting Surtur, allowing the fire demon to succeed in his plans and kill Hela while Thor, Loki, and the Asgardians escape.
 An alternate timeline version of Surtur makes a minor appearance in the Disney+ animated series What If...? episode "What If... Thor Were an Only Child?", voiced again by Clancy Brown.

Video games
 Surtur makes a cameo appearance in Marvel: Ultimate Alliance.
 Surtur appears in Thor: God of Thunder, voiced again by Rick D. Wasserman.
 Surtur appears as the final boss in Marvel Heroes.
 Surtur appears as a boss in Marvel Avengers Alliance.
 Surtur appears as a playable character and boss in Lego Marvel Super Heroes 2.
 Surtur appears as a boss in Marvel: Future Fight.
 Surtur appears in Marvel Ultimate Alliance 3: The Black Order, voiced by Jamieson Price.

References

Characters created by Jack Kirby
Characters created by Stan Lee
Comics characters introduced in 1963
Fictional characters with dimensional travel abilities
Fictional characters with fire or heat abilities
Fictional characters with immortality
Fictional characters with superhuman durability or invulnerability
Fictional swordfighters in comics
Male characters in film
Marvel Comics characters who are shapeshifters
Marvel Comics characters who use magic
Marvel Comics characters with superhuman strength
Marvel Comics demons
Marvel Comics film characters
Marvel Comics giants
Marvel Comics male supervillains
Thor (Marvel Comics)